Ardisia humilis (jet berry) is a species of flowering plant in the genus Ardisia in the family Primulaceae, native to southeastern Asia in southern China (Guangdong, Hainan), the Philippines, and Vietnam.

Description
Ardisia humilis is an evergreen shrub growing 1–2 m (rarely to 5 m) tall. The leaves are broad ovate to elliptical, 15–18 cm long and 5–7 cm broad, with a leathery texture and an acute apex. The flowers are reddish-purple to pink and 5–6 mm diameter; they are produced in corymbs in mid-spring. The fruit is a red to dark purple drupe 6 mm diameter, containing a single seed, and it matures in late autumn.

Status
Ardisia humilis is considered to be included in the single variable species Ardisia elliptica by some botanists.

References

humilis
Taxa named by Martin Vahl